Eucalyptus peninsularis, commonly known as Cummins mallee, is a species of mallee that is endemic to a small area of South Australia. It has smooth, greyish or brownish bark, lance-shaped adult leaves, flower buds in groups of between seven and eleven, pale creamy yellow flowers and urn-shaped fruit.

Description
It has smooth, greyish to brownish bark that is shed in ribbons. Young plants and coppice regrowth have sessile, dull green, elliptical to egg-shaped leaves arranged in opposite pairs. Flowering has been recorded in December and the flowers are pale creamy yellow.

Taxonomy
Eucalyptus peninsularis was first formally described in 1997 by Dean Nicolle in his book, Eucalypts of South Australia. The type material was collected north-west of Cummins on the road to Mount Hope in 1972. The specific epithet (peninsularis) is from the Latin word peninsula, meaning "a narrow body of land", referring to the distribution on the Eyre Peninsula.

Distribution and habitat
Cummins mallee is restricted to south-central parts of the Eyre Peninsula, especially near the Cummins and Yeelanna areas where it grows in open mallee or woodland.

Conservation status
Eucalyptus peninsularis occurs in a mallee community complex, often with E. dumosa or E. calycogona. That complex has been rated as "poorly conserved in South Australia". Only small parts of that ecosystem have been conserved, including in Hambidge Wilderness Protection Area, the Verran Tanks Conservation Park and the Wharminda Conservation Park.

See also
List of Eucalyptus species

References

Trees of Australia
peninsularis
Myrtales of Australia
Flora of South Australia
Plants described in 1997